The Men's snowboard big air competition at the FIS Freestyle Ski and Snowboarding World Championships 2023 was held on 2 and 4 March 2023.

Qualification
The qualification was started on 2 March at 09:20. The five best snowboarders from each heat qualified for the final.

Heat 1

Heat 2

Final
The final was started on 4 March at 12:30.

References

Men's snowboard big air